Route 15E or Highway 15E may refer to:
 Former Interstate 15E, now Interstate 215 in California
 Former K-15E (Kansas highway), now part of K-148

See also
List of highways numbered 15
List of highways numbered 15A
List of highways numbered 15W